Qaleh Gelineh-ye Sofla (also Romanized as Qal‘eh Gelīneh-ye Soflá, Qal‘eh Galīneh-ye Soflá, and Qal‘eh-ye Galīneh-ye Soflá; also known as Kaleh Kharagīnah, Qal‘eh Gelīneh-ye Pā’īn, and Qal‘eh-ye Kharagīneh) is a village in Sanjabi Rural District, Kuzaran District, Kermanshah County, Kermanshah Province, Iran. At the 2006 census, its population was 185, in 45 families.

References 

Populated places in Kermanshah County